SV Wacker Burghausen is a German football club based in Burghausen, Bavaria and is part of one of the nation's largest sports clubs with some 6,000 members participating in two dozen different sports.

History

The club was founded on 13 November 1930 and was made up largely of employees from the local chemical factory Wacker Chemie, which was established in 1914, and still sponsors the club today. The first football side in the city was part of the gymnastics club Turnverein Burghausen. In 1922, the footballers left TV to form 1. FC Burghausen which became part of SV at the time of its founding. Besides football, the new club had departments for shooting, athletics, and youth.

SV won the East Bavarian championship just three years later in 1933, but then afterwards toiled in anonymity in the local lower-level leagues until 1993 when they won the Landesliga Bayern-Süd (V) title, followed by the Bayernliga (IV) championship two years later, which advanced the club to the Regionalliga Süd (III). In 2002–03, the team played its way into the 2. Bundesliga where they competed until being relegated at the end of the 2006–07 campaign.

Wacker earned a seventh-place finish in the Regionalliga in 2007–08, which qualified the team for the new 3. Liga the following season. It finished the 2008–09 season in 18th place, on a relegation rank but was saved from having to step down to the Regionalliga by the withdrawal from the league of Kickers Emden for financial reasons.

The club finished in 18th place, on a relegation rank but was saved from having step down to the Regionalliga for a second time by the insolvency of Rot Weiss Ahlen. After got results in 2011–12 and 2012–13 the club finished 19th in the league in 2013–14 and was relegated to the Regionalliga Bayern.

Reserve team

The SV Wacker Burghausen II team played in the Bayernliga (IV) from 2005 to 2007, making Burghausen one of the few clubs to have had both first and second teams play at this level. The reserve team finished 15th in the Landesliga Bayern-Süd (VI) in the 2010–11 season, narrowly avoiding relegation. At the end of the 2011–12 season the team qualified directly for the newly expanded Bayernliga after winning the league championship in the Landesliga. It played in the Bayernliga until 2014 when the club decided to withdraw the team from competition at the end of the season.

Honours
The club's honours:

League
 Regionalliga Süd (III)
 Champions: 2002
 Bayernliga (IV)
 Champions: 1995
 Landesliga Bayern-Süd (IV)
 Champions: 1993
 Runners-up: 1973, 1984
 2. Amateurliga Oberbayern A (IV)
 Champions: 1962
 Bezirksliga Oberbayern-Ost (V)
 Champions: 1965, 1983

Cup
 Bavarian Cup
 Runners-up: 2009, 2010, 2011, 2013, 2017

Reserve team
 Landesliga Bayern-Süd (V)
 Champions: 2005, 2012
 Bezirksoberliga Oberbayern (VI)
 Runners-up: 2001
 Bezirksliga Oberbayern-Ost (VII)
 Runners-up: 1999

Youth
 Bavarian Under 19 championship
 Champions: 2006, 2013
 Runners-up: 2011
 Bavarian Under 17 championship
 Champions: 2009
 Runners-up: 2005

Recent managers
Recent managers of the club:

Recent seasons
The recent season-by-season performance of the club:

SV Wacker Burghausen

SV Wacker Burghausen II

 With the introduction of the Bezirksoberligas in 1988 as the new fifth tier, below the Landesligas, all leagues below dropped one tier. With the introduction of the Regionalligas in 1994 and the 3. Liga in 2008 as the new third tier, below the 2. Bundesliga, all leagues below dropped one tier.

Key

Retired numbers
11 –  Marek Krejčí, Forward (2004–07) – posthumous honour.

Current squad

References

External links
 Official team website (football)
 Official team website (youth football)
 Official team website (general)
 The Abseits Guide to German Soccer

 
Football clubs in Germany
Football clubs in Bavaria
Football in Upper Bavaria
Association football clubs established in 1930
1930 establishments in Germany
Altötting (district)
2. Bundesliga clubs
3. Liga clubs